Kirk Beecher Taylor is an American actor, acting teacher, and musician with credits in film, television, and stage. He is best known for his work in the movies Full Metal Jacket, Death Wish 3, School Daze, The Last Dragon, The Angriest Man in Brooklyn and the Broadway Tour of Five Guys Named Moe.

Early life
The oldest of five children, Taylor was raised in Bridgeport, Connecticut by Dr. Robert Beecher Taylor and Rose Marie Taylor. He started performing on stage at Central High School.

Taylor was the first Black student to become the coveted  King of The Barnum Festival, a statewide scholastic and leadership competition. He also played in a local R&B group, The Mighty Chain Reaction alongside guitar sensation, Jonathan Dubose Jr.

Education
Taylor attended New York University’s Tisch School of the Arts where he received a BFA (major in drama and minor in music). He studied acting under Lee Strasberg, Stella Adler, David Garfield, Barbara Covington Poitier, David Gideon, Elaine Aiken and Clay Stevens. 

He studied composition with Lehman Engel and Vladimir Padwa; voice with Helen Lightner and Kenneth Kamal Scott; piano with John Randolph Eaton and Don Friedman; trumpet with Jimmy Owens. Taylor was a founding member of the Awamu Theater Company, New York University's first and only African American repertory company.

Career

Stage
In 1993, Taylor took center stage as Nomax in the first Broadway tour of Five Guys Named Moe, a jubilant musical featuring the songs of legendary band leader Louis Jordan.  In preceding years, he graced the Off-Broadway stage as George the Barman in Take Me Along (1985), Bagheera the Panther in Mowgli (1985), Joey Robbins in The War Party (1986), and toured as jazz giant Jelly Roll Morton in Jelly Roll! The Music & The Man (1997).   Taylor also performed as Edmond in the Off-Off-Broadway production of King Lear (1990) as part of the Brooklyn Shakespeare Company. 

On the West Coast, he depicted the patriarch Dr. George Gibbs in Our Town (1998) with South Coast Repertory,  General Vershinin in Three Sisters with Actor’s Alley (2000) and was the lead opposite the “Queen of Funk” Chaka Khan in the Stevie Wonder-inspired Las Vegas tribute show Signed, Sealed, Delivered (2002). 
 

Taylor appeared in the touring production of What Men Don't Tell (2004), which included performances at the Beacon Theatre on Broadway. In 2019, he joined the renowned Denver Center for the Performing Arts where he played the dual roles of Captain and trumpet-playing Fabian in their winter production of Shakespeare's Twelfth Night.

Film
In 1984, Taylor began his film career as Flash the waiter in Francis Ford Coppola's The Cotton Club. In the following years, he embodied some memorable characters: Crunch in The Last Dragon, The Giggler in Death Wish 3, Sgt Payback in Stanley Kubrick's celebrated war drama Full Metal Jacket, and Sir Nose in Spike Lee's 1988 collegiate classic, School Daze.

He can also be seen in other noteworthy films such as Jacknife with Robert De Niro, The Return of Superfly with Sam Jackson, Bonfire of the Vanities, MacArthur Park, and The Sum of All Fears as AFRAT Specialist Wesson in 2002. Taylor appeared alongside Robin Williams in The Angriest Man in Brooklyn in 2014. In 2017, he was cast as Referee Burton in the indie feature 12 Round Gun, and starred as Cephas in Harry Lennix's musical feature film, Revival! (2018).

Television

Taylor made his television debut in 1981 on the long-running soap opera Guiding Light. He played a recurring role opposite Kevin Bacon as his football player teammate. Since then, his television credits have included True Blue, Law & Order, Ghost Writer, Chicago Hope, and To Have and To Hold. In 2000, Taylor joined an all-star cast to portray the role of Roland Brown in the TNT television movie Freedom Song. Working alongside stars Danny Glover and Loretta Devine, the film documented the true life struggles of the SNCC civil rights workers. In 2001, he landed the starring role of Sterling Hamilton in BET's One Special Moment. He can also be seen as British arms dealer Paul Green on NCIS: Los Angeles, French attorney Gilles Lemaire in the final season of All My Children and Dr. Morris on Days of Our Lives .

Music
Taylor has been a featured soloist in numerous ensembles and events, including the New Song Gospel Choir at The Church on the Way under the direction of Rose "Sly and the Family" Stone (2004–2009), the international broadcast of Hour of Power at the famed Crystal Cathedral (2010–2012), The Havana Jazz Festival (2016) and Herbie Hancock's International Jazz Day concert at Saint Peter's “Jazz” Church in New York City (2018), which was subsequently broadcast by Queens Public Television in 2020.

In 2014, Taylor made his Carnegie Hall debut in the Broadway Reunion with Black Stars of the Great White Way under the direction of four-time Grammy Award-winning vocal arranger Chapman Roberts. Taylor was also part of a similar show The Black Stars of The Great White Way: A Chapman Roberts Concept when it appeared at National Black Theatre Festival in Winston-Salem, N.C.  Taylor owns the ASCAP-registered publishing company Rising Oak Music.

Teaching
Taylor taught acting at the Lee Strasberg Institute in New York City (1988-1993), for the Young People's, Professional, and NYU programs.

His students have included Jessie L. Martin, Chandra Wilson, Gary Dourdan, Karina Lombard, Charles Malik Whitfield, Jose Zuniga, Beth Littleford, Ken Marino, Mari Morrow, and Benno Fürmann.

Taylor teaches 3-5 day acting intensives through his Art Group Acting Company in Montreal, Los Angeles, and at the University of Nations in Hawaii and Norway.

Taylor reflected on his acting career with Hollywood Toto:

Filmography

Film

Television

Stage

References

External links
 
 

Year of birth missing (living people)
Living people
20th-century American male actors
21st-century American male actors
American male film actors
American male television actors
Male actors from Bridgeport, Connecticut
Tisch School of the Arts alumni